Tony Halbig (born July 2, 1993 in Pinneberg) is a German racing driver.

Career 
Halbig began his racing career in karting 2007. He remained in karting until 2009. 2011 he began his formula racing career. He competes in the German Formula Three Championship for Motopark Academy He scored points in both races of his first round and finished the second race on the fourth position. After the first round he is on the sixth position in the championship.

Career summary 
 2007–2009: Karting
 2011: German Formula Three Championship

References

External links 
 

1993 births
Living people
People from Pinneberg
German racing drivers
German Formula Three Championship drivers
Racing drivers from Schleswig-Holstein
Motopark Academy drivers